Denmark was represented by Aud Wilken, with the song "Fra Mols til Skagen", at the 1995 Eurovision Song Contest, which took place on 13 May in Dublin. "Fra Mols til Skagen" was chosen as the Danish entry on 25 March.

Before Eurovision

Dansk Melodi Grand Prix 1995 
The final was held at the DR TV studios in Copenhagen on 25 March 1995 and hosted by Sidsel Agensø and Gry la Cour. Eleven songs competed in the contest and the winner was selected by the votes of a five-member jury over two rounds. In the first round, the top five songs were selected to advance to the second round of voting, which led to the victory of Aud Wilken with the song "Fra Mols til Skagen" by a 2-point margin. Voting was extremely tight, with only 7 points separating the top five songs. The show was watched by 1.1 million viewers in Denmark, making it the most popular show of the evening and second most popular show of the week.

The five-member jury consisted of Søs Fenger, Bent Fabricius-Bjerre, Dorte Hygum Sørensen, Sebastian and Monica Krog-Meyer.

At Eurovision 
Pre-contest betting rated "Fra Mols til Skagen" among the favourites for victory. On the night of the final Wilken performed 19th in the running order with, by chance, the two top favourites in the betting – Sweden and Slovenia – coming immediately before and after. At the close of voting "Fra Mols til Skagen" had received 92 points, placing Denmark 5th of the 23 entries, the country's best placement in the 1990s. The Danish jury awarded its 12 points to Sweden. The contest was watched by a total of 1.5 million viewers in Denmark.

Voting

References 

1995
Countries in the Eurovision Song Contest 1995
Eurovision